"Fallin' is a collaboration between Scottish power pop band Teenage Fanclub and American alternative hip hop trio De La Soul. It was released in early 1994. The song was recorded for the soundtrack to the action film Judgment Night, which featured other collaborations between well-known rock, metal and hip hop groups. The chorus was sampled from the song "Free Fallin' from Tom Petty's 1989 solo album Full Moon Fever.

Music video
The "Fallin' music video was directed by Josh Taft. It features De La Soul and Teenage Fanclub wandering the hallways and classrooms of a high school while children dressed as angels dance around during a school play.

Track listing
 "Fallin' (Album Version)"
 "Fallin' (Acapella)"
 "Fallin' (Remix)"
 "Fallin' (Instrumental)"

Charts

See also
Judgment Night track listing

References

1993 songs
1994 singles
De La Soul songs
Rap rock songs
Songs written by David Jude Jolicoeur
Songs written by Kelvin Mercer
Songs written by Prince Paul (producer)
Songs written by Vincent Mason